The City of Marvels is a 1986 historical fiction Spanish novel written by Eduardo Mendoza Garriga about the city of Barcelona and its cultural evolution during the turn of the 20th century. Its central character, Onofre Bouvila, represents a lower class character and their collective ideology.

In 1990, Bernard Molloy translated the novel into English.

Plot 
The protagonist of the story is Onofre Bouvila, a man who grows up in a small rural town in Catalonia. As a child, he sees his father leave the town for Cuba to become rich. Although he sends letters on his voyage, the letters soon stop. Many years later his father returns and appears to have accumulated great wealth. Soon, the family learns that he was unsuccessful and borrowed money from the mafia in Barcelona to purchase a suit.

Years later, Onofre travels to Barcelona in order to find a job. He finds an inn that is run by a father along with his daughter Delfina. As Onofre finds himself unable to get work, Delfina helps him by introducing him to a group of anarchists. His job becomes the distribution of anarchist pamphlets which puts him at odds with the city officials and the guards.

Onofre distributes these pamphlets for a while at the world trade fair construction site, however he soon realises he isn't being adequately rewarded for his efforts so he begins to sell hair restorer to tradesmen from the fair. Here he meets his right-hand man Efren who provides the muscle. After this Onofre becomes a gangster working for one of the bosses of Barcelona, through a clever plan he successfully takes over the gang and kicks out the other gangs in town.

After this chapter in his Onofre's dealings become less violent but arguably no more legitimate. Barcelona's expansion plan is in full swing and with these plots of land on the outskirts of town are rapidly changing value depending on the rumours of where metro lines will be created. Through sly dealings and misguiding buyers Onofre makes his fortune here.

After this Onofre invests in the silent movie business, before having to go into exile when Primo de Rivera comes to power. After this he is forced into retirement however by this stage he is one of the most power and rich men in Spain, he obsessively renovates his Mansion while ignoring his family and spending the majority of his nights in brothels.

As the book draws to a close, Onofre becomes more pensive and meets another woman who takes his fancy whose father is an inventor who he had met many years ago, he agrees to support his project to build a form of blimp. He falls for this woman and has one night with her before the unveiling of their project and the next world trade fair in 1929.

Finally Onofre dies when their Blimp crashes into the sea at the world trade fair.

Reception
After discussing the various ways the novel captures and intrigues the reader, Jonathan Franzen, writing for the Los Angeles Times, states, " It’s all fairly interesting, but when the book ends ... what lingers is not the memory of a real Onofre Bouvila but only the spirit of the hard, flamboyant era he represents." Franzen further states that "though modern-day Catalonians may find fascinating his account of Barcelona’s architectural growing pains, the impartial reader working through the 10th dense page of it may be forgiven for asking: Is this book for me?" Franzen answers this question by saying, To the extent that Mendoza tries at all to answer this question and find general truth in specific history, he does it as a cynic, highlighting in every anecdote the ugly, the venal, the ridiculous, the cruel. ... To depict an entire epoch in this way is arrogant if we’re meant to believe the world has improved since then; profoundly diminishing if we’re meant to believe it hasn’t.Similarly, Kirkus Reviews said the novel was "[p]leasant enough reading, but no grabber; the cool, level tone ... sees to that, along with the ice-cold Onofre, who becomes progressively dwarfed by the scale of events."

Publishers Weekly added, "Unfortunately, the characterization remains opaque, though the novel entertains and informs with its panorama of Catalan politics and social life, the advent of cinema and flying machines, and amusing cameos of Rasputin and Mata Hari."

Film adaptation 
The novel was adapted into a 1999 Spanish film of the same name, with Olivier Martinez as Onofre Bouvila and Emma Suárez as Delfina.

References 

20th-century Spanish novels
Spanish-language novels
1986 novels
Novels set in Barcelona